Stroggylocephalus is a genus of leafhoppers (family Cicadellidae).

Species
 Stroggylocephalus agrestis (Fallén, 1806) 
 Stroggylocephalus favosus Yang, 1996 
 Stroggylocephalus indicus Rao, 1989 
 Stroggylocephalus livens (Zetterstedt, 1840) 
 Stroggylocephalus mixta (Say, 1825) 
 Stroggylocephalus placidus (Provancher, 1889)

References

Cicadellidae
Hemiptera genera